Men's Slalom World Cup 1989/1990

Calendar

Final point standings
In Men's Slalom World Cup 1989/90 all results count.

Men's Slalom Team Results
bold indicate highest score - italics indicate race wins

External links
FIS-ski.com - World Cup standings - Slalom 1990

World Cup
FIS Alpine Ski World Cup slalom men's discipline titles